or Tahkonanna (Ainu: タㇵコナンナ) (5 April 1902 - 30 April 1994) was the last fluent speaker of the Sakhalin Ainu language. She was born in Otasu village on the West coast of Sakhalin Island, and moved to Rayciska (Raichishika) during her childhood. After World War II she was relocated to Hokkaido and toward the end of her life lived in an old-age home in Monbetsu, Hidaka, Hokkaido.  She served as an informant with the Piłsudski Research Project and other projects until her death in 1994.

References

Last known speakers of a language
Japanese Ainu people
Russian Ainu people
People from Sakhalin Oblast
People from Hokkaido
1902 births
1994 deaths
Russian and Soviet emigrants to Japan